Jan Carlos Granado (born September 26, 1982 in Caracas, Venezuela) is a Venezuelan former professional baseball pitcher.

Career
Granado signed as an undrafted free agent with the Cincinnati Reds in 1999.  He was selected by the Minnesota Twins in the minor league section of the 2004 Rule 5 draft.

Granado represented Venezuela national baseball team in the 2009 World Baseball Classic.

External links

1982 births
Living people
Águilas del Zulia players
Anderson Joes players
Bravos de Margarita players
Chattanooga Lookouts players
Dayton Dragons players
Diablos Rojos del México players
Fort Myers Miracle players
Guerreros de Oaxaca players
Gulf Coast Reds players
Mexican League baseball pitchers
Grosseto Baseball Club players
Navegantes del Magallanes players
New Britain Rock Cats players
Newark Bears players
Potomac Cannons players
Sarasota Reds players
Baseball players from Caracas
Tigres de Aragua players
Vaqueros Laguna players
Venezuelan expatriate baseball players in Italy
Venezuelan expatriate baseball players in Mexico
Venezuelan expatriate baseball players in the United States
World Baseball Classic players of Venezuela
2009 World Baseball Classic players